A Black Lives Matter mural was painted outside Seattle City Hall, in the U.S. state of Washington, in 2021. The mural reads "Black Lives Matter, enough is enough" along Fourth Avenue between Cherry Street and James Street. The work was commissioned by community groups, including the Center on Contemporary Art and the Onyx Fine Arts Collective. It was designed by a muralist from the Seattle Department of Transportation, which is expected to provide maintenance.

See also
 2021 in art

References

2020s murals
2021 establishments in Washington (state)
Black Lives Matter art
Downtown Seattle
2021 paintings
Murals in Washington (state)
African-American history in Seattle